This is a partial list of Techialoyan codexes.

These codexes established indigenous land claims in Mexico by documenting the founding and history of a town.

"Many of these documents are written with ink of European origin, in the Náhuatl language, using the Latin alphabet in capital letters and rough script, and often on amate (bark) paper."

 Codex E - Codex of Cempoallan, Hidalgo 
 Codex of Coacalco (Cohualcalco) 
 Codex of San Antionio Techialoyan
 Codex of San Francisco Xonacatlán
 Codex Techialoyan García Granados 
Techialoyan Codex of Cuajimalpa
 Techialoyan of Tepotzotlán 
 Techialoyan of Zempoala

References 

Mesoamerican codices
Nahuatl literature
Aboriginal title
Land law